Walter Garrison Runciman, 3rd Viscount Runciman of Doxford,  (10 November 193410 December 2020), usually known informally as Garry Runciman, was a British historical sociologist. A senior research fellow at Trinity College, Cambridge Runciman wrote several publications in his field. He also sat on the Bank of England's Securities and Investment Board and chaired the British Government's Royal Commission on Criminal Justice (1991–1993).

Background 
Runciman was the son of Leslie Runciman, 2nd Viscount Runciman of Doxford, by his second wife, Katherine Schuyler Garrison. British historian Sir Steven Runciman was his uncle. He was educated at Eton College, where he was an Oppidan Scholar, and Trinity College, Cambridge.

Runciman inherited the viscountcy on the death of his father in 1989.

Career 
Runciman joined the faculty of Trinity College, Cambridge in the 1950s as a historical sociologist and became a junior research fellow after submitting a thesis entitled Plato's Later Epistemology. In the 1960s he became primarily a sociologist. He became a senior research fellow in 1971, researching in the field of comparative and historical sociology. Runciman's principal research interest was the application of neo-Darwinian evolutionary theory to cultural and social selection.

He held honorary degrees from King's College London and the Universities of Edinburgh, Oxford, and York. He was also an Honorary Foreign Member of the American Academy of Arts and Sciences and an Honorary Bencher of Inner Temple. He was elected to the British Academy in 1975 and served as its president from 2001 to 2005. Runciman was also an honorary fellow of Nuffield College, Oxford.

Official and parliamentary work 
Runciman was invited by the Governor of the Bank of England to serve on the Securities and Investment Board (later to become the Financial Services Authority), from which he retired in 1998.

Runciman chaired the British Government's Royal Commission on Criminal Justice, established in 1991 and which continued Sir John May's inquiry into the convictions of the Maguire Seven and encompassed further miscarriages of justice. It reported to parliament in 1993. As a result, the Criminal Appeal Act 1995 established the Criminal Cases Review Commission as an executive Non-Departmental Public Body.

Runciman was a member of the House of Lords as a hereditary peer from the time he inherited the viscountcy on 1 September 1989. He spoke 26 times in the chamber until 11 November 1999 when he lost his right to sit there when the bulk of the hereditary peers were removed by the House of Lords Act 1999. Runciman sat for a subsequent by-election to the Lords in 2010 to fill the Crossbench hereditary seat vacancy following the death of the Viscount Colville of Culross; the House seat went to the Earl of Clancarty.

Publications 
Runciman's first major publication was Relative Deprivation and Social Justice: a Study of Attitudes to Social Inequality in Twentieth-Century Britain. Since then, he has published A Critique of Max Weber's Philosophy of Social Science, A Treatise on Social Theory, and The Social Animal. In 2004, he edited and contributed to a British Academy occasional paper Hutton and Butler: Lifting the Lid on the Workings of Power, which deals with the events surrounding Britain's participation in the invasion of Iraq and the way in which it was presented to the British public.

Marriage and children
Runciman married Ruth Hellman on 17 April 1963.  She was made a Dame Commander of the Most Excellent Order of the British Empire (DBE) in 1998. They had three children:

 Hon Lisa Runciman (born 18 August 1965)
 David Walter Runciman, 4th Viscount Runciman of Doxford (born 1 March 1967)
 Hon Catherine Runciman (born 18 July 1969)

Runciman died on 10 December 2020. His heir, the 4th Viscount, is a political scientist and writer who teaches at Cambridge University as a Professor of Politics.

Arms 

Arms hidden, as no reliable source found -->

References

External links 
 
 Interviewed by Alan Macfarlane 16 April 2014 (video)

1934 births
2020 deaths
Alumni of Trinity College, Cambridge
British sociologists
Commanders of the Order of the British Empire
English people of Scottish descent
Fellows of the American Academy of Arts and Sciences
Fellows of the British Academy
Fellows of Trinity College, Cambridge
Garry Runciman
People educated at Eton College
Presidents of the British Academy
Viscounts in the Peerage of the United Kingdom
Runciman of Doxford